Pao hilgendorfii, sometimes known as Hilgendorf's puffer, is a species of pufferfish in the family Tetraodontidae. It is a tropical freshwater species native to the Mahakam basin in Borneo. The species was originally described as a member of Tetraodon but was moved to the then-new genus Pao in 2013.

References 

Tetraodontidae
Fish described in 1905